Tell Rifaat (also spelled Tel Rifaat, Tel Rif'at or Tal Rifaat) is a city in northern Aleppo Governorate, northwestern Syria. Nearby localities include Azaz to the north, Mare' to the east, Kafr Naya to the south, Deir Jmal and Oqayba to the southwest and Ibbin Samaan to the west. In the 2004 census, Tell Rifaat had a population of 20,514.

During the Syrian Civil War, Tell Rifaat was captured by the Free Syrian Army in 2012, the Islamic State of Iraq and the Levant in 2014, and the Islamic Front in 2015. During this time, the town was bombed several times by the Syrian government and its allies. Tell Rifaat was captured by the Syrian Democratic Forces on 16 February 2016 after heavy Russian air strikes which destroyed all three health facilities in the town.

History
Tell Rifaat has been inhabited since the Iron Age when it was known as "Arpad." It became the capital of the north Syrian Aramaean state of Bit Agusi established by Gus of Yahan in the 9th-century BCE. Bit Agusi stretched from the A'zaz area in the north to Hamath in the south.

Arpad later became a major vassal city of the Kingdom of Urartu. In 743 BCE, during the Urartu-Assyria War, the Neo-Assyrian king Tiglath-Pileser II laid siege to Arpad following the defeat of the Urartuan army of Sarduri II at Samsat. The siege ended with the Assyrian capture of the city in 743 BCE. Afterward Arpad served a provincial capital. The remains of Arpad's walls are still preserved in Tell Rifaat to the height of 8 meters.

A settlement existed on the modern-day site of Tell Rifaat during the Seleucid period (301 BCE-63 BCE). A hoard of coins from this period was discovered in 1967. After the nearby Tell Aran, Tell Rifaat is the largest tell in the Jabal Semʻān region.

Syrian Civil War
For a period during the Syrian Civil War which began in March 2011, Tell Rifaat came under siege by Syrian security forces. During the siege, residents were unable to receive food supplies, including bread, from Aleppo.

In the early summer of 2012, Syrian government authorities withdrew from Tell Rifaat following fighting with the Free Syrian Army (FSA). Following this, government authorities in the town were replaced by a council made up of local Islamic scholars, judges and former Syrian Army officers, ruling in the basis of Sharia. Since its capture by the FSA, opposition rebels have been transporting flour for bread from Turkey to Tell Rifaat.

On 8 August 2012, Tell Rifaat was bombed by the Syrian Air Force, resulting in the deaths of 6 people, all members of the Blaw family. Opposition activists based in Aleppo claimed that Syrian Army forces were attempting to cut off the FSA's transport route between Tell Rifaat and Aleppo.

By November 2013, the town was under control of the Islamic State of Iraq and the Levant (ISIL). In January 2014, ISIL forces withdrew from the northern Aleppo area, and rebel fighters, mainly members of the Islamic Front, defeated ISIL militants in the town. The Conquest Brigade of the Islamic Front came into control of the town.

By January 2015, Tell Rifaat was under the control of the Conquest Brigade of the Islamic Front.

On 15 February 2016, the town was captured by the Syrian Democratic Forces, led by the Army of Revolutionaries. Russian airstrikes, which preceded the SDF assault, forced the majority of the population to escape. Since the SDF capture of Tell Rifaat, the town became the headquarters of the Army of Revolutionaries. After the Turkish Armed Forces and allied groups captured Afrin during Operation Olive Branch, displaced residents of Tel Rifaat rallied in Azaz to demand the expulsion of the SDF from the town. At the end of March 2018, the Syrian Republican Guard and the Russian Armed Forces entered the town.

On December 2, 2019 a Russian air raid allegedly killed 8 children, all under 15 years old, on their walk to school.

See also 
Euphrates Syrian Pillar Figurines
Euphrates Handmade Syrian Horses and Riders

References

Bibliography

Cities in Syria
Populated places in Azaz District
Iron Age sites in Syria
Archaeological sites in Aleppo Governorate